AEI may refer to:

 Adelaide Educational Institution of South Australia
 Aei Latin-script trigraph
 AEI Music Network Inc. (Audio Environments Incorporated), which created the "Foreground Music" industry in 1971
 Albert Einstein Institute, the Max Planck Institute for Gravitational Physics, Germany
 Albert Einstein Institution, an organisation involved in non-violent methods of political resistance based in the US
 Alliance for European Integration, the ruling coalition in Moldova since the July 2009 election
 American Enterprise Institute, a conservative think tank
 Architectural Engineering Institute
 Archive of European Integration
 Associated Electrical Industries, large company in the UK (now defunct)
 Automatic Equipment Identification, as used by the railroad industry
 Average Earnings Index, British labour market measure
 Average Earnings Index (horse racing), American horse racing measure

See also
 EAI (disambiguation)